Group B of the 2008 Fed Cup Europe/Africa Zone Group III was one of two pools in Group III of the Europe/Africa zone of the 2008 Fed Cup. Six teams competed in a round-robin competition, with the top team advancing to Group II for 2009.

Finland vs. Armenia

Egypt vs. Morocco

Montenegro vs. Moldova

Finland vs. Montenegro

Egypt vs. Moldova

Morocco vs. Armenia

Finland vs. Egypt

Montenegro vs. Armenia

Moldova vs. Morocco

Finland vs. Moldova

Egypt vs. Armenia

Montenegro vs. Morocco

Finland vs. Morocco

Egypt vs. Montenegro

Moldova vs. Armenia

  placed first in this group and thus advanced to Group II for 2009, where they placed last in their pool of three. They were thus relegated back down to Group III for 2010.

See also
 Fed Cup structure

References

External links
 Fed Cup website

2008 Fed Cup Europe/Africa Zone